6-Monoacetylmorphine (6-MAM, 6-acetylmorphine, or 6-AM) is an opioid and also one of three active metabolites of heroin (diacetylmorphine), the others being morphine and the much less active 3-monoacetylmorphine (3-MAM).

Pharmacology
6-MAM occurs as a metabolite of heroin. Once it has passed first-pass metabolism, 6-MAM is then metabolized into morphine or excreted in urine.

Heroin is rapidly metabolized by esterase enzymes in the brain and has an extremely short half-life.  It has also relatively weak affinity to μ-opioid receptors because the 3-hydroxy group, essential for effective binding to the receptor, is masked by the acetyl group.  Therefore, heroin acts as a pro-drug, serving as a lipophilic transporter for the systemic delivery of morphine, which actively binds with μ-opioid receptors.

6-MAM already has a free 3-hydroxy group and shares the high lipophilicity of heroin, so it penetrates the brain just as quickly and does not need to be deacetylated at the 6-position in order to be bioactivated; this makes 6-MAM somewhat more potent than heroin.

Availability
6-MAM is rarely encountered in an isolated form due to the difficulty in selectively acetylating morphine at the 6-position without also acetylating the 3-position. However, it is found in significant amounts in black tar heroin along with heroin itself.

Synthesis

The production of black tar heroin results in significant amounts of 6-MAM in the final product. 6-MAM is approximately 30 percent more active than diacetylmorphine itself, This is why despite lower heroin content, black tar heroin may be more potent than some other forms of heroin. 6-MAM can be synthesized from morphine using glacial acetic acid with an organic base as a catalyst. The acetic acid must be of a high purity (97–99 per cent) for the acid to properly acetylate the morphine at the 6th position effectively creating 6-MAM. Acetic acid is used rather than acetic anhydride, as acetic acid is not strong enough to acetylate the phenolic 3-hydroxy group but is able to acetylate the 6-hydroxy group, thus selectively producing 6-MAM rather than heroin. Acetic acid is a convenient way to produce 6-MAM, as acetic acid also is not a watched chemical as it is the main component of vinegar.

Chemistry

Detection in bodily fluids
Since 6-MAM is a metabolite unique to heroin, its presence in the urine confirms heroin use.  This is significant because a urine immunoassay drug screen typically tests for morphine, which is a metabolite of a number of legal and illegal opiates/opioids such as codeine, morphine sulfate, and heroin.  Trace amounts of 6-MAM, a specific metabolite of heroin, are also excreted for approximately 6–8 hours following heroin use. So a urine specimen must be collected soon after the last heroin use; however, the presence of 6-MAM suggests that heroin was used as recently as within the last day.

6-MAM is naturally found in trace amounts in the brain of certain mammals.

See also 
M3G, morphine-3-glucuronide an inactive metabolite of morphine much as 3-MAM is the less active metabolite of heroin (notably here as morphine is an active secondary metabolite of heroin itself with 6-Monoacetylmorphine being the intermediate stage)
M6G, morphine-6-glucuronide the active variant in close relation to 6-MAM, being relative as twin metabolites of this articles very metabolite itself, morphine, twinned to a metabolite (3-MAM) of a parent compound (heroin) of this article's chemical

References 

Acetate esters
4,5-Epoxymorphinans
Heroin
Opioid metabolites
Morphine
Mu-opioid receptor agonists
Prodrugs
Phenols
Semisynthetic opioids